Spearville may refer to some places in the United States:

 Spearville, Kansas
 Spearville Township, Ford County, Kansas